Triple Trouble is a 1950 comedy film directed by Jean Yarbrough and starring The Bowery Boys. The film was released on August 13, 1950, by Monogram Pictures and is the nineteenth film in the series.

Plot
The boys are on their way home from a masquerade party when they hear noises in a warehouse and decide to investigate.  They find the warehouse is being robbed and they are mistakenly captured by the police and sentenced for robbing it.  Gabe, as their lawyer, gets them off with just probation but Slip insists that he and Sach accept jail time in order to find out who is behind the series of robberies in the neighborhood. He deduces that the instructions are being sent from inside the prison via a short wave radio.

Upon entering the prison they are mistaken for notorious criminals and make fast friends with the masterminds behind the robberies.  Whitey, who owns a short wave radio, overhears the plans and informs Louie who runs out into the street and tells the police of the plans that his sweet shop will be robbed next.  The cop doesn't believe him, but eventually Louie is able to persuade the warden of the prison when Whitey hears about a jailbreak attempt.  The warden sets up a sting operation and catches the gang that was behind the robberies and the boys are exonerated.

Cast

The Bowery Boys
Leo Gorcey as Terrance Aloysius 'Slip' Mahoney
Huntz Hall as Horace Debussy 'Sach' Jones
William Benedict as Whitey
David Gorcey as Chuck
Buddy Gorman as Butch

Remaining cast
Gabriel Dell as Gabe Moreno
Bernard Gorcey as Louie Dumbrowski
Richard Benedict as Skeets O'Neil
G. Pat Collins as Shirley O'Brien
Joe Turkel as Benny The Blood
Lyle Talbot as the guard

Home media
Warner Archives released the film on made-to-order DVD in the United States as part of "The Bowery Boys, Volume Four" on August 26, 2014.

References

External links

1950 films
Bowery Boys films
American black-and-white films
1950 comedy films
Monogram Pictures films
American comedy films
1950s English-language films
Films directed by Jean Yarbrough
1950s American films